Shannon Kenny (born 23 May 1968) is an Australian actress.

She is best known for playing Debbie Halliday in the 1980s Australian soap opera Sons And Daughters.

She has appeared in Bodily Harm in 1995, Dream On in 1995, Seinfeld (1997), Purgatory, Batman Beyond (1999–2000), The Invisible Man (2000–2002), and 7th Heaven (2002–2005).

She married Nestor Carbonell on 3 January 2001; they have two sons, Rafael and Marco.

References

External links

20th-century Australian actresses
21st-century Australian actresses
Living people
1968 births